Rubus canadensis is a North American species of flowering plant in the rose family known by the common names smooth blackberry, Canadian blackberry, thornless blackberry and smooth highbush blackberry. It is native to central and eastern Canada (from Newfoundland to Ontario) and the eastern United States (New England, the Great Lakes region, and the Appalachian Mountains).

This rhizomatous shrub forms thickets up to 2 to 3 meters (7–10 feet) tall. The leaves are deciduous and alternately arranged, each measuring 10 to 20 centimeters (4-8 inches) long. The inflorescence is a cluster of up to 25 flowers. The fruit is an aggregate of many small drupes, each of which contains a tiny nutlet. The plant reproduces by seed, by sprouting up from the rhizome, and by layering. The stems can grow one meter (40 inches) in height in under two months.

Rubus canadensis grows in many types of forested habitat, as well as on disturbed sites. Associated plants may include mountain maple (Acer spicatum), serviceberry (Amelanchier spp.), hobblebush (Viburnum alnifolium), scarlet elder (Sambucus pubens), common blackberry (Rubus allegheniensis), beaked hazel (Corylus cornuta), southern mountain cranberry (Vaccinium erythrocarpum), minnie-bush (Menziesia pilosa), and rosebay (Rhododendron catawbiense).

Many types of animals feed on the fruits and foliage of this shrub. The thickets provide cover and nesting sites.

The fruits of this plant provided food for Native American groups, who also used parts of the plant medicinally at times.

References

External links 
 
 
 The Nature Conservancy
 
 

canadensis
Flora of Canada
Flora of the Eastern United States
Flora of the Appalachian Mountains
Flora of the Great Lakes region (North America)
Plants described in 1753
Taxa named by Carl Linnaeus